Nivola is a term created by Miguel de Unamuno to refer to his works that contrasted with the realism prevalent in Spanish novels during the early 20th century.  Since his works were not fully novels, or "novelas" in Spanish, Unamuno coined a new word, "nivolas," to describe them.

Origin of the term: Niebla

The term nivola appears for the first time as  a subtitle for Unamuno's book Niebla. With this term, the writer was trying to express his rejection of the dominant principles of realism as expressed in novels:  the psychological characterization of the characters, the realistic environments, and the third person omniscient narrator.

He expresses this in his prologue to Niebla:

Niebla is the story of Augusto Pérez, a single man, philosophical and melancholy, who dedicates his time to long walks, and reflection, with his dog Orfeo.  Augusto falls in love with Eugenia and idealizes her in a similar way to Don Quijote's idealization of Dulcinea.  He dedicates himself to winning her love.  The most famous passage of the novel occurs towards the end when the principal character decides to confront the real author, Miguel de Unamuno, to ask for advice about his destiny.  The encounter degenerates into a confrontation in which the author decides to kill his character, which leads to the character's death a few pages later.

Characteristics of the nivolas

A nivola has the following characteristics:

Predominance of ideas over form: Just as in his poetry and plays, Unamuno's nivolas give priority to content over form. In fact novels like Amor y pedagogía (Love and Pedagogy) approach the genre of a thesis novel (novela de tesis), cultivated by Benito Pérez Galdós or Blasco Ibáñez among others.
Scarce psychological development of the characters: the characters of the nivolas are often defined by a single personal quality which some see as making them seem somewhat flat, in contrast to the multifaceted characters of realist novels.  The characters of Niebla, Amor y Pedagogía or Abel Sánchez are incarnations of an idea or a passion, which impedes them from relating to the world in a normal way.
Scarce realism in the environment: Except for his first novel Paz en la guerra (Peace in War), and perhaps his last, San Manuel Bueno, mártir (Saint Emmanuel the Good, Martyr), Unamuno's novels hardly describe the place or time in which they develop.  In this way they accent their abstract nature.
Rapid writing process: in contrast to the slow and progressive writing of realist novels, Unamuno's nivolas, according to him, resulted from a hasty birth without a long period of preparation, documentation and planning.

Beyond Niebla, the following works can be classified as nivolas:  Abel Sánchez, Amor y pedagogía and La tía Tula (Aunt Tula). Arguably a nivola, San Manuel Bueno, mártir contains greater psychological development and narrative description than the other works, and is generally considered Unamuno's masterpiece.

Further reading
Ayala, Francisco: La Novela: Galdós y Unamuno, Seix Barral, Barcelona, 1974
Elizalde, Ignacio: Miguel de Unamuno y su novelística, Caja de Ahorros Provincial de Guipuzcoa,  Zarauz, 1983
Moncy, Agnes: La Creación del personaje en Miguel de Unamuno, La Isla de los Ratones, Santander, 1963

Literary genres
Literary theory
Literary terminology